Marsypopetalum is an Asian plant genus in the family Annonaceae and tribe Miliuseae.  Its recorded range is: Andaman Is., Borneo, Cambodia, Hainan, Java, Laos, Lesser Sunda Is., Malaya, Myanmar, Nicobar Is., Philippines, Thailand and Vietnam.

Species
Plants of the World Online currently includes:
 Marsypopetalum littorale (Blume) B.Xue & R.M.K.Saunders - China, Indochina, W. Malesia
 Marsypopetalum lucidum (Merr.) B.Xue & R.M.K.Saunders - Philippines
 Marsypopetalum modestum (Pierre) B.Xue & R.M.K.Saunders - Indochina (synonym M. crassum (R.Parker) B.Xue & R.M.K.Saunders)
 Marsypopetalum pallidum (Blume) Backer - type species - W. Malesia
 Marsypopetalum triste (Pierre) B.Xue & R.M.K.Saunders - Vietnam

References

External Links 
 
 

Annonaceae
Annonaceae genera
Asia
Flora of Malesia